Chrysocarabus is a subgenus of beetle in family Carabidae.

Species
Species within this subgenus include:
Carabus auronitens Fabricius, 1792 
Carabus lineatus Dejean, 1826 
Carabus olympiae Sella, 1855 
Carabus solieri Dejean, 1826 
Carabus splendens Olivier, 1790

References

Insect subgenera